Verda is an unincorporated community in  Harlan County, Kentucky, United States. The Verda Post Office  is closed.

References

Unincorporated communities in Harlan County, Kentucky
Unincorporated communities in Kentucky
Coal towns in Kentucky